The Colombian Trust of Foreign Trade better known as Fiducoldex, is  a financial government agency of the Government of Colombia that acts as a fiduciary trust to finance foreign trade.

References

Government agencies established in 1992
Ministry of Commerce, Industry and Tourism (Colombia)